Ron Hale (born January 2, 1946) is an American actor best known for his role as Roger Coleridge on the ABC soap opera Ryan's Hope for its entire run (1975–1989). He played the recurring role of Mike Corbin, the father of mobster Sonny Corinthos in the ABC soap opera General Hospital. Hale, who had portrayed Corbin since 1995, announced his retirement in 2010.

Filmography
Search for Tomorrow (1951, TV Series) - Walt Driscoll (1969)
A Lovely Way To Die (1968)
Me, Natalie (1969) - Stanley Dexter
Love is a Many Splendored Thing (1973, TV Series) - Jim Abbott
All the President's Men (1976) - Frank Sturgis
Ryan's Hope (1975–1989, TV Series) - Roger Coleridge
Matlock (1989, TV Series) - Eldon Williams
MacGyver (1990, TV Series) - Mike Travers
Original Intent (1992) - Dr. Johnson
Trial by Jury (1994) - Bailiff
The Dark Mist (1996) - Pentakis
Port Charles (1997, TV Series) - Mike Corbin
The Brothers Flub (1999) - Squish (voice)
Sunstorm (2001) - Jack
Intimate Portrait (2003, TV Series, Vanessa Marcil) - Himself
General Hospital (1995–2010, TV Series) - Mike Corbin
The Ghost and The Whale (2017) - Father Reinhart

Awards and nominations

References

External links

1946 births
American male soap opera actors
American male television actors
Living people